"Crazier" is a song by American singer-songwriter Taylor Swift, taken from the soundtrack to the 2009 film Hannah Montana: The Movie. Swift wrote the song with Robert Ellis Orrall and produced it with Nathan Chapman. A country ballad, the song has lyrics about falling in love. In Hannah Montana: The Movie, Swift makes a cameo and performs the song. "Crazier" was released on Radio Disney and Disney Channel.

The song peaked at number 17 on the US Billboard Hot 100 and was certified platinum by the Recording Industry Association of America (RIAA). It also entered the singles charts in Australia, Canada, and the United Kingdom. "Crazier" was praised by critics, many of whom named it the best song on the soundtrack.

Background and release
Swift co-wrote "Crazier" with Robert Ellis Orrall. The song is set in compound time with six eighth notes per bar. It is played in E major at a moderately fast tempo of 144 beats per minute. Swift's vocals span one octave, from E3 to B4. The chorus has the following chord progression, E—B—C#m—A. USA Today described it as a "pretty waltz".

The song's appearance in Hannah Montana: The Movie came about after filmmakers approached Swift about using her music in the film. Film officials emailed her asking for a song "that was perfect to fall in love to" and "sort of a country waltz". Although it was not written intentionally for the film, Swift sent in "Crazier" and the filmmakers "loved it". In addition, Swift offered to perform the song in the film herself as a cameo appearance. In the film, Swift performs at an open mic fundraiser to save a small town's treasured park from developers. The quick scene was filmed in a single day, but Swift's performance impressed film members. Film director Peter Chelsom said, "I've made a very big mental check to work with her again." A music video for "Crazier", directed by Peter Chelsom, features excerpts from Hannah Montana: The Movie and premiered on March 28, 2009 on the Disney Channel. It features Swift playing the song on acoustic guitar and her backup band playing other instruments, intertwined with scenes of the movie characters Miley Stewart (Miley Cyrus) and Travis Brody (Lucas Till).

Critical reception
Warren Truitt of About.com complimented Swift's "chim[ing]" in the ballad. Heather Phares of Allmusic praised the track, calling it "the best song on Hannah Montana: The Movie". She complimented it for being "more genuine, more effortless, than any of [Cyrus'] or Hannah's tracks". James Berardinelli agreed, stating, "Arguably, the movie's biggest mistake is having Taylor Swift perform a song, since she can sing and the comparison is not flattering to the movie's star." Leah Greenblatt of Entertainment Weekly described "Crazier" as "a pretty, yearning ballad". Premiere magazine reviewer Olivia Putnal referred to Swift's performance one of the film's "high points". Peter Hartlaub of the San Francisco Chronicle believed that Swift's cameo was enjoyable, but also calls it a mistake on the part of the filmmakers, explaining "Swift is so talented that she makes Cyrus seem bland by comparison." Perry Seibert from TV Guide wrote, "when genuine teen star Taylor Swift shows up to perform [...] she demonstrates all the spontaneity and authenticity that Miley Cyrus lacks." In June 2022, Insider ranked "Crazier" as Swift's fourth best soundtrack song.

Chart performance
"Crazier" made its debut on the Billboard Hot 100 at number seventy-two on the week ending April 11, 2009. "Crazier" rose three spots to number sixty-nine in the following week, but jumped to number thirty-eight on the week ending April 25, 2009 due to an 87 percent increase in digital downloads. For the week of Saturday, May 2, 2009, the song reached its peak on the Hot 100 at number seventeen, selling 110,000 downloads. It also peaked at number twenty-eight on the Pop 100 chart. As of November 2014, "Crazier" had sold one million copies in the United States.

As the song was not officially released to radio as a single, digital sales also accounted for its appearance on international charts. The song debuted at number seventy-nine on the week ending April 11, 2009. For the week ending May 2, 2009, it reached number thirty on Hot Canadian Digital Singles and number sixty-three on the Canadian Hot 100. "Crazier" reached number fifty-seven on the Australian Singles Chart. The song debuted and peaked at number one-hundred in the UK Singles Chart for the week ending May 16, 2009.

Charts

Certifications

References

2000s ballads
2009 songs
Taylor Swift songs
Country ballads
Songs written for films
Songs written by Taylor Swift
Songs written by Robert Ellis Orrall
Song recordings produced by Taylor Swift
Song recordings produced by Nathan Chapman (record producer)